Albion is a historic plantation house located near Blackstock, Fairfield County, South Carolina.  It was built about 1840 by a wealthy planter named Alexander Douglas.

It was added to the National Register of Historic Places in 1984.

Information
Albion is significant as an unusually intact, although altered, example of a nineteenth-century Fairfield County plantation house with classical design elements which display an awareness of high-style design. Alexander Douglas, who is reported to have built Albion ca. 1840, was a wealthy planter whose estate was valued in 1860 at $76,750. 

Albion is a two-story, L-shaped, weatherboarded frame residence with a side gabled roof and rear additions. The façade has a two-tiered veranda with Ionic columns, plain balustrade, and a simple entablature with triglyphs above the first story veranda. The second story veranda columns are cropped, indicating possible later alterations. Columns with both plain and fluted shafts are paired at the ends of the veranda and in the center. The windows are shuttered and have fluted surrounds with corner blocks. Both central entrances have a traceried elliptical fanlight and sidelights. An unusual parapeted dormer pierces the front center roof, perhaps another alteration. Pedimented end gables are ornamented with block modillions and lunettes which flank the chimneys. Listed in the National Register December 6, 1984.

References

Plantation houses in South Carolina
Houses on the National Register of Historic Places in South Carolina
Houses completed in 1840
Houses in Fairfield County, South Carolina
National Register of Historic Places in Fairfield County, South Carolina
1840 establishments in South Carolina